Keith Caple (6 May 1923 – 29 November 2006) was an Australian weightlifter. He competed at the 1948 Summer Olympics and the 1956 Summer Olympics.

References

External links
 

1923 births
2006 deaths
Australian male weightlifters
Olympic weightlifters of Australia
Weightlifters at the 1948 Summer Olympics
Weightlifters at the 1956 Summer Olympics
Sportspeople from Sydney
Commonwealth Games medallists in weightlifting
Commonwealth Games bronze medallists for Australia
Weightlifters at the 1950 British Empire Games
Weightlifters at the 1954 British Empire and Commonwealth Games
20th-century Australian people
21st-century Australian people
Medallists at the 1954 British Empire and Commonwealth Games